The National Assembly of Pakistan (or ) is the lower legislative house of the bicameral Parliament of Pakistan, which also comprises the Senate of Pakistan (upper house). The National Assembly and the Senate both convene at Parliament House in Islamabad, the capital of Pakistan. The National Assembly is a democratically elected body consisting of a total of 336 members who are referred to as Members of the National Assembly (MNAs), of which 266 are directly elected members and 70 reserved seats for women and religious minorities from all over the country. A political party or a coalition must secure 172 seats to obtain and preserve a majority.

Members are elected through the first-past-the-post system under universal adult suffrage, representing electoral districts known as National Assembly constituencies. According to the constitution, the 70 seats reserved for women and religious minorities are allocated to the political parties according to their proportional representation.

Each National Assembly is formed for a five-year term, commencing from the date of the first sitting, after which it is automatically dissolved. The National Assembly can only be dissolved by the President of Pakistan; it cannot be dissolved by the Prime Minister of Pakistan.

Election for 13th National Assembly was held on 18 February 2008. New session of National Assembly was started from March 2008. On 17 March 2013, 13th National Assembly was dissolved on completion of its five-year term under Article 52 of the constitution. 2013 Pakistani general election (for the 14th National Assembly) was held on 11 May 2013. Members of 14th National Assembly took oath on 1 June 2013. The 14th National Assembly dissolved on 31 May 2018 upon completing its 5-year term under Article 52 of the constitution. The 15th National Assembly of Pakistan took their oath on 13 August 2018.

On 3 April 2022, President of Pakistan Arif Alvi dissolved the Assembly Under Section 58-I and 48-I on the advice of Prime Minister Imran Khan. On 7 April, the Supreme Court of Pakistan set aside the dissolution order, restoring the National Assembly.

After these events, on the 11th of April, after National Assembly proceedings, a vote was held on deciding the next Prime Minister of Pakistan, overseen by Ayaz Sadiq. There were only two candidates contesting, from the PTI, was Shah Mehmood Qureshi, and from the PMLN, Shehbaz Sharif. Before the vote, 123 members of the PTI resigned from the National Assembly and walked out and the deputy-speaker of the National Assembly also walked out, leaving the vote to be conducted under the supervision of Ayaz Sadiq, resulting in the election of Shehbaz Sharif as the Prime Minister of Pakistan, and leading to the former Prime Minister, Imran Khan holding massive rallies against the new government. Then, on 16 October 2022, the Election Commission of Pakistan (ECP) ignored the governments plea to delay the elections for the 8 National Assembly seats that PTI workers had resigned from. Out of these 8, PTI Chairman and now former PM Imran Khan ran for 7 seats. Imran Khan succeeded,  losing 1 seat originally held by PTI (Karachi), and returned to the National Assembly for the first time since his ousting in April 2022.

History 

The first session of the first Constituent Assembly of Pakistan was held on 10 August 1947 at Sindh Assembly Building, in Karachi. On 11 August 1947, Quaid-i-Azam Muhammad Ali Jinnah was elected unanimously as the President of the Constituent Assembly of Pakistan and the National Flag was formally approved by the Assembly.
 On 12 August 1947, a resolution was approved regarding officially addressing Mr. Muhammad Ali Jinnah as "Quaid-i-Azam Muhammad Ali Jinnah". On the same day, a special committee called the "Committee on Fundamental Rights of Citizens and Minorities of Pakistan" was appointed to look into and advise the Assembly on matters relating to fundamental rights of the citizens, particularly the minorities, with the aim to legislate on these issues appropriately.
 On 14 August 1947, Lord Mountbatten, Governor General of India, addressed the Constituent Assembly of Pakistan. The transfer of power took place on 15 August. The Quaid gave a reply to the address in the House, on which the principles of the State of Pakistan were laid.
 On 15 August 1947, Quaid-i-Azam was sworn in as the first Governor General of Pakistan. Sir Mian Abdul Rashid, Chief Justice of Pakistan, administered oath of office from him. The Quaid remained in this position until his death on 11 September 1948.

Powers 

The Constitution, which was passed unanimously by the National Assembly in April 1973, provides a federal parliamentary system of government, with the President as the ceremonial head of the state and an elected Prime Minister as the head of the government. Under Article 50 of the Constitution the federal legislature is the bicameral Majlis-e-Shoora (Parliament), which comprises the President and the two Houses, the National Assembly and the Senate. The National Assembly, Pakistan's sovereign legislative body, makes laws for the federation under powers spelled out in the federal legislative List and also for subjects in the concurrent List, as given in the fourth schedule of the Constitution. Through debates, adjournment motions, question hour, and standing committees, the National Assembly keeps a check on the government. It ensures that the government functions within the parameters set out in the Constitution, and does not violate the people's fundamental rights. The Parliament scrutinizes public spending and exercises control of expenditure incurred by the government through the work of the relevant standing committees. The Public Accounts Committee has a special role to review the report of the auditor general. The Senate, the upper house of the Parliament, has equal representation from the federating units balancing the provincial inequality in the National Assembly, where the number of members is based on population of the provinces. The Senate's role is to promote national cohesion and harmony, and work as a stabilizing factor of the federation. The Senate has 104 members who serve six-year terms which are alternated so that half the senators are up for re-election by the electoral college every three years. The National Assembly consists of 342 members. The Constitution does not empower the President to dissolve the National Assembly. The Senate is not subject to dissolution. Only the Parliament can amend the Constitution, by two-thirds majority vote separately in each House.

List of Assemblies

Members of National Assembly

Qualifications 
The Constitution of Pakistan lists a number of requirements for members of the National Assembly in Article 62.

The constitution also details a number of disqualifications in Article 63, which include mental instability, insolvency, criminal conviction and accepting dual-citizenship or relinquishing Pakistani nationality, among others. Furthermore, candidates found to have opposed Pakistan's ideology or worked against the integrity of the country, after its establishment in 1947, are disqualified.

National Assembly Composition 

The National Assembly has 336 members, including 60 seats reserved for women and 10 for Non-Muslims, as per Article 51. The seats in the National Assembly are allocated to each province and the federal capital on the basis of population, as officially published in the preceding census. The present allocation of seats is as under:

Tenure 
The National Assembly is elected for a five-year term on the basis of adult franchise and one person, one vote. The tenure of a Member of the National Assembly is for the duration of the House, or sooner, in case the Member dies or resigns. The tenure of the National Assembly also comes to an end if dissolved on the advice of the Prime Minister or by the President in his discretion under the Constitution. Under the 1973 Constitution, a member of Parliament may not hold the office of the Prime Minister more than twice. In the 1990s, Benazir Bhutto and Nawaz Shareef proposed a bill to amend the 1973 constitution to allow a Member to serve a third term as Prime Minister.

Speaker and Deputy Speaker 
According to The Constitution

 (1) After a general election, the National Assembly shall, at its first meeting and to the exclusion of any other business, elect from amongst its members a Speaker and a Deputy Speaker and, so often as the office of Speaker or Deputy Speaker becomes vacant, the Assembly shall elect another member as Speaker or, as the case may be, Deputy Speaker.
 (2) Before entering upon office, a member elected as Speaker or Deputy Speaker shall make before the National Assembly oath in the form set out in the Third Schedule.
 (3) When the office of Speaker is vacant, or the Speaker is absent or is unable to perform his functions due to any cause, the Deputy Speaker shall act as Speaker, and if, at that time, the Deputy Speaker is also absent or is unable to act as Speaker due to any cause, such member as may be determined by the rules of procedure of the Assembly shall preside at the meeting of the Assembly.
 (4) The Speaker or the Deputy Speaker shall not preside at a meeting of the Assembly when a resolution for his removal from office is being considered.
 (5) The Speaker may, by writing under his hand addressed to the President, resign his office.
 (6) The Deputy Speaker may, by writing under his hand addressed to the Speaker, resign his office.
 (7) The office of Speaker or Deputy Speaker shall become vacant if:

 (a) he resigns his office;
 (b) he ceases to be a member of the Assembly;
 (c) he is removed from office by a resolution of the Assembly, of which not less than seven days' notice has been given and which is passed by the votes of the majority of the total membership of the Assembly.

 (8) When the National Assembly is dissolved the Speaker shall continue in his office till the person elected to fill the office by the next Assembly enters upon his office.

The Speaker of the House is the presiding officer of the National Assembly. The speaker is assisted by the Deputy Speaker. Both officers are elected from within the ranks of the National Assembly and, by current convention, are usually members of the majority party. The election of the two officers is the first matter an incoming National Assembly deals with, as mandated by the constitution. Apart from presiding over National Assembly debates, the Speaker may also assume the duties of Acting President, if the position is vacant (in case the President as well as Chairman Senate are not available).

Sessions 
The National Assembly is divided into sessions. It had to meet for 130 days before the First Amendment passed on 8 May 1974 in the constitution of 1973. According to this amendment, the maximum duration between successive sessions was reduced to 90 days from 130 days, and there must be at least three sessions in a year. A session of the National Assembly is summoned by the President under Article 54(1) of the Constitution. In the summoning order the President gives the date, time and place (which is usually the Parliament House), for the National Assembly to meet. The date and time for the summoning of the National Assembly is immediately announced over radio and television. Generally, a copy of the summon is also sent to the Members at their home addresses. The National Assembly can also be summoned by the Speaker of National Assembly on a request made by at one-fourth of the total membership of the National Assembly. If the National Assembly is so requisitioned, it must be summoned within 14 days.

Procedure

Constitutional role 
Article 50 of the Constitution provides that the Parliament shall consist of president and the two houses known as the National Assembly and the Senate. The National Assembly has an edge over the Senate by legislating exclusively on money matters. With exception to money bills, however, both the houses work together to carryout the basic work of the Parliament, i.e. law making.

Legislative procedures 
The bill relating to the Federal Legislative List can be originated in either house. If the House passed a bill through majority vote, it shall be transmitted to the other house. If the other house passes it without amendment, it shall be presented to the President for assent.

If the bill, transmitted to the other house, is not passed within ninety days or rejected, it shall be considered in a joint sitting to be summoned by the President on the request of the house in which the bill was originated. If the bill is passed in the joint sitting, with or without amendments, by the votes of majority of the members of the two houses, it shall be presented to the President for assent.

If the bill is presented to the President for assent, he shall assent to the bill in not later than ten days. If it is not a money bill, the President may return it to the Majlis-e-Shoora with a message requesting that the bill be reconsidered and that an amendment specified in the message be considered. The Majlis-e-Shoora shall reconsider the bill in a joint sitting. If the bill is passed again, with or without amendment, by vote of the majority of the members present and voting, it shall be presented to the President and the President shall give his assent within ten days; failing which such assent shall be deemed to have been given.

Under the Constitution, the Parliament may also legislate for two or more provinces by consent and request made by those provinces. If the federal government proclaims a state of emergency in any province, the power to legislate about that province is vested in the Parliament. But the bills passed by the Parliament during the state of emergency, shall cease to be in force after the expiration of six months from the date that the emergency is lifted. Nevertheless, the steps already taken under these acts shall remain valid.

Leaders

Leader of the House 

The Leader of the House is the highest ranking representative of the majority party in National Assembly, usually the Prime Minister.

Leader of the Opposition 

The Leader of the Opposition is the highest ranking representative of the main opposition party.

Committees 
While recognizing the Committee System, the committees have been empowered to go into all matters of the ministry. A matter can be remitted to a standing committee by the Speaker or the Assembly suo moto and without moving any motion.

The committees have also been empowered to invite or summon before it any member or any other person having a special interest in relation to any matter under its consideration and may hear expert evidence and hold public hearing.

Composition and elections 
The Parliament of Pakistan, according to the Constitution of 1973, is bicameral. Article 50 of the Constitution clearly states that the Parliament of Pakistan consists of the President and two Houses known as the National Assembly and the Senate. The composition of the National Assembly is specified in Article 51 of the Constitution of Pakistan. Originally there were 210 National Assembly seats including 10 women which was increased to 237 in 1985 and later to 342. Currently, there are a total of 342 seats in the National Assembly. Of these, 272 are filled by direct elections. In addition, the Pakistani Constitution reserves 10 seats for religious minorities and 60 seats for women, to be filled by proportional representation among parties with more than 5% of the vote. After the 25th amendment Article 51. (1) There shall be [three hundred and thirty-six] seats for members in the National Assembly, including seats reserved for women and non-Muslims. Article 51. [(3A) Notwithstanding anything contained in clause (3) or any other law for the time being in force, the members of the National Assembly from the Federally Administered Tribal Areas to be elected in the general elections, 2018 shall continue till dissolution of the National Assembly and thereafter this clause shall stand omitted.

Members of the National Assembly are elected by the people in competitive multi-party elections, to be held at most five years apart on universal adult franchise. To be a member of electoral college, according to Article 62 of the Constitution, candidates must be citizens of Pakistan and not less than 25 years of age.

2018 election

Results of the Pakistani general election, 2018

Dissolution 
National Assembly can be dissolved at the initiative of the Prime Minister. If dissolved, new elections are conducted for the Assembly. Article 58 of the Constitution of Pakistan deals with the dissolution of the Assembly:

58. Dissolution of the National Assembly:
 (1) The President shall dissolve the National Assembly if so advised by the Prime Minister; and the National Assembly shall, unless sooner dissolved, stand dissolved at the expiration of forty-eight hours after the Prime Minister has so advised.
Explanation: Reference in this Article to "Prime Minister" shall not be construed to include reference to a Prime Minister against whom a notice of a resolution for a note of no-confidence has been given in the National Assembly but has not been voted upon or against whom such a resolution has been passed or who is continuing in office after his resignation or after the dissolution of the National Assembly.
 (2) Notwithstanding anything contained in clause (2) or Article 48, the President may dissolve the National Assembly in his discretion where, a vote of no-confidence having been passed against the Prime Minister, no other member of the National Assembly commands the confidence of the majority of the members of the National Assembly in accordance with the provisions of the Constitution, as ascertained in a session of the National Assembly summoned for the purpose.

See also 
 Constitution of Pakistan
 List of constituencies of Pakistan
 Member of the National Assembly of Pakistan
 List of Pakistan National Assembly Seats
 List of provincial governments of Pakistan
 Member of the Provincial Assembly
 Politics of Pakistan

Notes

References

External links 

 
 Constitution of Pakistan (English)
 Constitution of Pakistan (Urdu)

 
Pakistan
Parliament of Pakistan